Walter Tollmien (13 October 1900, in Berlin – 25 November 1968, in Göttingen) was a German fluid dynamicist.

Life
Walter Tollmien studied from the winter semester 1920–1921 mathematics and physics with Ludwig Prandtl in Göttingen and then from 1924 onwards worked under Prandtl at Kaiser Wilhelm Institute. After a research stays in United States in 1930 and 1933 he became a Professor in 1937 at Technische Hochschule Dresden. In 1957 he took over the post of Director at Max-Planck Institute for fluid mechanics research.

Achievements
Through his pioneering work as a researcher and a teacher Walter Tollmien brought fluid mechanics into the lime light and as an inter disciplinary science of extreme importance. The transition from laminar to turbulence results in Tollmien–Schlichting waves named after him.

Work
 Tollmien, Walter (1929): Über die Entstehung der Turbulenz. 1. Mitteilung, Nachr. Ges. Wiss. Göttingen, Math. Phys. Klasse 1929: 21ff
 Tollmien, Walter (1931): Grenzschichttheorie, in: Handbuch der Experimentalphysik IV,1, Leipzig, S. 239–287.

External links
 

Fluid dynamicists
1900 births
1968 deaths
Max Planck Institute directors
Academic staff of TU Dresden